Pierre-Alexandre Vial (born 25 May 1975) is a retired French decathlete.

In 1997 he won the bronze medal at the European U23 Championships, the gold medal at the 1993 Mediterranean Games, and finished nineteenth at the 1992 World Championships. He won the gold medal at the 2001 Jeux de la Francophonie.

His personal best score was 8070 points, achieved in June 1992 at the Mediterranean Games in Bari.

References

1975 births
Living people
French decathletes
Mediterranean Games gold medalists for France
Mediterranean Games medalists in athletics
Athletes (track and field) at the 1993 Mediterranean Games